Fuganto Widjaja (born 1980/1981) is an Indonesian billionaire businessman.

Fuganto Widjaja is the grandson of Eka Tjipta Widjaja, the founder of the Sinar Mas Group, an Indonesian palm oil and property conglomerate started before the Second World War. In April 2015, he revealed a surprise takeover bid for Asia Resource Minerals, the coal mining company founded by Nathaniel Philip Rothschild.

Early life 
Fuganto Widjaja was educated at High School in Singapore, before earning a bachelor's degree in Computer Science & Economics from Cornell University in 2003, and an M Phil in Finance from the Cambridge Judge Business School in 2004.

Career 

Fuganto Widjaja is Director at Sinar Mas Multihara TBK. He is also the Group Chief Executive Officer & Executive Director at Golden Energy & Resources Ltd.

Golden Energy & Resources is a subsidiary of the Sinar Mas Group.

Sinar Mas Group is a brand of companies which is active in six business pillars—Pulp & Paper, Agri-business & Food, Financial Services, Developer & Real Estate, Communications & Technology and in Energy & Infrastructure.

Golden Energy and Resources Limited is a Singapore listed leading energy and resources company in the Asia Pacific region.

An heir to the large family-owned conglomerate, Fuganto Widjaja is on a mission to modernise the family business. He is shifting the business to focus on energy, infrastructure, telecommunications and education. As an entrepreneur, he believes in starting and creating new things that people need.

In April 2015, he revealed a surprise takeover bid by Asia Coal Energy Ventures, a Sinar Mas subsidiary, for Asia Resource Minerals, a shell company which owned a majority of Berau Coal’s stock, founded by Nathaniel Philip Rothschild.

This was a surprise takeover as past contenders have failed to secure a majority stake in the coal company. It was also viewed as a move that restored confidence in the Indonesian’s ownership of a sizeable mining venture.

Fuganto Widjaja shared with the media that the investment was to support the Indonesian government’s aim to boost electricity supply for the country through coal.

Under Fuganto Widjaja’s leadership, Berau Coal received an award for its corporate social responsibility program at the 2019 ASEAN Coal Award.
As part of this program, the company assisted the Punan Basap Tribe in a resettlement project.

Widjaja is a president director of Berau Coal Energy.

Fuganto Widjaja also received an award as a TOP leader on CSR Community 2018. This is an award organised by TOP Business.

In April 2019, Fuganto Widjaja launched Gear Innovation Network, a tech innovation centre by Golden Energy and Resources in Singapore.  The centre was established with an initial investment of US$2 million and supported by the Economic Development Board in Singapore. Gear Innovation Network focuses on transforming capital-intensive industries such as mining, logistics and construction through digital technologies in Southeast Asia.

Golden Energy & Resources Limited sources coal from its coal mining concession areas, covering approximately 66,204 hectares in South and Central Kalimantan and South Sumatra Basin.

Sinar Mas Group has been recognised as one of the winners in the 2019 Indonesian Employers of Choice Awards (EOC) by SWA and Korn Ferry Indonesia.

The company has also been awarded as one of the top three social business innovation companies in the category of property, real estate and insurance by Warta Ekonomi in 2018.

In 2019, Sinar Mas Mining was recognised as one of HR Asia’s Best Companies to work for. The company achieved this status in the categories of HR Innovation, Employer Branding and Leadership and Development.

After a stint at UBS, Widjaja founded Pristine Brand mineral water, before becoming a director of Sinar Mas Multiartha, holding company of Sinar Mas Financial services.

References

Living people
Indonesian billionaires
1980s births
Cornell University alumni
Alumni of the University of Cambridge